Tore Krogstad (born 30 March 1967) is a retired Norwegian football goalkeeper.

He was born in Kongsvinger, and started his career in Kongsvinger IL. He was drafted into the senior team in 1984, as the youngest player in the highest Norwegian league at the time. He played for Kongsvinger until 1991, except for the 1988 season in Strømmen IF. In 1991, he decided to attend the Norwegian Police University College in Oslo. He rejoined Strømmen, and also played half a season for Lillestrøm SK before joining Vålerenga Fotball ahead of the 1994 season. He retired after the 1999 season. He has later worked for the Football Association of Norway.

References

1975 births
Living people
Norwegian footballers
Kongsvinger IL Toppfotball players
Strømmen IF players
Lillestrøm SK players
Vålerenga Fotball players
Sportspeople from Kongsvinger

Association football goalkeepers